Alliance for Social Democracy is a political party in Benin led by Robert Dossou. The ASD was legally recognized on 12 October 1990.

References

Political parties in Benin
Social democratic parties in Africa
Political parties established in 1990
1990 establishments in Benin